Wodiczko is a Polish surname. Notable people with the surname include:

Bohdan Wodiczko (1911–1985), Polish conductor and music teacher
Krzysztof Wodiczko (born 1943), Polish artist, son of Bohdan

Polish-language surnames